The list of ship decommissionings in 1981 includes a chronological list of all ships decommissioned in 1981.


See also 

1981
 Ship decommissionings
Ship